The Thailand five-baht coin is a denomination coin of the Thai baht, the Thai currency unit.

Like all coins in Thailand, its obverse features King of Thailand, Vajiralongkorn Bodindradebayavarangkun, and previously Bhumibol Adulyadej.

Series

2009 changes 
On February 2, 2009, the Treasury Department announced changes to several circulating coins. The five-baht coin, which previously weighed 7.5 grams, was reduced to 6 grams by slightly reducing its thickness. Metal composition and other features remain the same as previous issues.

2018 series 
The Ministry of Finance announced on March 28, 2018 that the first coins featuring the portrait of His Majesty King Maha Vajiralongkorn Bodindradebayavarangkun would be put in circulation on April 6.

Mintages

Commemorative issues 
 the 50th Anniversary of King Bhumibol Adulyadej
 the 8th Asian Games
 Commemoration of the Blessing and Naming Rites of Princess Bajrakitiyabha
 FAO's Ceres Award to the Queen Sirikit
 the 80th Anniversary of Princess Mother Srinagarindra
 Commemoration of the King Prajadhipok's Monument
 the Centenary of the King Vajiravudh
 the Bicentenary of Ratanakosin
 Commemorative of World Food Day
 the 75th Anniversary of World Scout
 the 84th Anniversary of Princess Mother Srinagarindra
 the 5th Cycle Birthday of King Bhumibol Adulyadej
 Rajamagalapisek Royal Ceremony
 the Bicentenary of the King Nangklao
 the 5th Cycle Birthday of the Queen Sirikit
 the 18th SEA Games
 the 50th Anniversary Celebrations of the King Bhumibol Adulyadej's Accession

References

See also 
 Thai baht

Coins of Thailand
Five-base-unit coins